John Greer may refer to:
John Greer, character in Person of Interest
John Greer (sculptor), Canadian sculptor
John W. Greer, Jr. (1909–1994), Georgia politician
John Alexander Greer (1802–1855), Texas politician
Big John Greer (1923–1972), American blues singer
John Michael Greer, American author